Jean Breaux is an American politician serving as a member of the Indiana Senate from the 34th District. She was appointed to the Senate in December 2006. Breaux is a former employee of the Indiana Department of Commerce. She was also employed by the Community Development Corporation. She currently works for the Forest Manor Multi-Service Center. Breaux is a member of the Indiana Black Legislative Caucus.

External links
State Senator Jean Breaux official Indiana State Legislature site

References

Democratic Party Indiana state senators
Living people
Politicians from Indianapolis
Indiana Wesleyan University alumni
African-American state legislators in Indiana
21st-century American politicians
Year of birth missing (living people)
21st-century American women politicians
African-American women in politics
Women state legislators in Indiana
21st-century African-American women
21st-century African-American politicians